Zanthoxylum dipetalum is a rare species of tree in the family Rutaceae and in the same genus as Sichuan pepper. It is known by the Hawaiian names Kāwa'u and Heaʻe and is endemic to the Hawaiian archipelago, where it grows in forests on 3 or 4 of the islands.

There are two varieties.
Z. d. var. dipetalum is present on Kauaʻi, in the mountains of Oʻahu, on Hawaiʻi in Hawaiʻi Volcanoes National Park, and possibly on Molokaʻi.
Z. d. var. tomentosum is known from fewer than 30 individuals on Hualālai volcano on Hawaiʻi. This variety is a federally listed endangered species of the United States.

The roots of Z. dipetalum have been found to contain several chemical compounds, including canthin-6-one, chelerythrine, nitidine, tembetarine, avicennol, xanthoxyletin, lupeol, hesperidin, sitosterol, and magnoflorine.

References

External links
USDA Plants Profile for Zanthoxylum dipetalum

dipetalum
Endemic flora of Hawaii
Biota of Hawaii (island)
Biota of Oahu